Denis Anthony Cauchi (born 15 January 1965 in Floriana, Malta) was a Maltese professional footballer who played for Floriana, Birkirkara, Rabat Ajax, Marsa and Marsaxlokk during his career, he played as a defender.

Honours

Floriana
Winner
 1992/93 Maltese Premier League

Winner
 1993, 1994 Maltese Cup

Runner Up
 1988, 1989 Maltese Cup

External links
 

Living people
1965 births
Maltese footballers
Malta international footballers
Floriana F.C. players
Birkirkara F.C. players
Lija Athletic F.C. players
Rabat Ajax F.C. players
Marsa F.C. players
Marsaxlokk F.C. players
People from Floriana
Association football defenders